Coleophora binotapennella is a moth of the family Coleophoridae. It is found in Spain, France, Germany, the Czech Republic, Slovakia, Hungary, Romania, North Macedonia, Lithuania, Ukraine, northern and southern Russia and China. It occurs in desert-steppe and desert biotopes.

Adults are on wing in July and August.

The larvae feed on Atriplex nitens, Atriplex tatarica and possibly Chenopodium species. They feed on the generative organs of their host plant.

References

binotapennella
Moths described in 1843
Moths of Europe
Moths of Asia